The Armstrong Whitworth Wolf was a British two-seat reconnaissance aircraft ordered by the Royal Air Force in 1923.

Design and development
The Wolf was a two-bay biplane of unorthodox design, with the fuselage mounted between the two sets of wings. No production order was placed, and the three machines built served their days at the Royal Aircraft Establishment at Farnborough as experimental testbeds.

Alongside the RAF's order in 1923, Armstrong Whitworth also built two for the RAF Reserve Flying School at Whitley, and a final, sixth aircraft in 1929. As trainers, they proved popular with pilots, although less so with ground crews for whom the rigging and undercarriage were awkward to maintain.

All Wolves were retired from service in 1931 and all but the most recently built were scrapped. The final aircraft was taken to Hamble for use as an instructional airframe.

Operators

Royal Air Force
Royal Aircraft Establishment

Specifications (Wolf)

See also

Notes

References

 
 
 

1920s British military reconnaissance aircraft
Wolf
Biplanes
Single-engined tractor aircraft
Aircraft first flown in 1923